The Genna crime family, was a crime family that operated in Prohibition-era Chicago. From 1921 to 1925, the family was headed by the six Genna brothers, known as the Terrible Gennas. The brothers were Sicilians from the town of Marsala and operated from Chicago's Little Italy and maintained control over the Unione Siciliana. They were allies with fellow Italian gang the Chicago Outfit. After a bloody war led to their demise in the 1920s, the gang was eventually absorbed by the Chicago Outfit.

D'Andrea and the Unione Siciliana
Anthony D'Andrea was a Sicilian Mafia boss in Chicago's Little Italy. His closest allies were the Genna brothers, who operated illegal gambling clubs and salons in his territory. In 1919, D'Andrea became president of the Chicago chapter of the Unione Siciliana, an organization dedicated to helping poor Sicilian immigrants. D'Andrea wanted more political power, and ran to become alderman of Chicago's 19th Ward, which included Little Italy. This started the Aldermen's Wars between D'Andrea and John Powers, an Irish saloon-keeper who was the sitting alderman. On May 11, 1921, D'Andrea was shot and killed while entering his apartment.

The Genna brothers
The Genna brothers consisted of six Sicilian brothers: "Bloody" Angelo, Antonio "The Gentleman", Mike "The Devil", Peter, Sam, and Vincenzo aka "Jim". In 1919, the Gennas became involved in bootlegging; they obtained a federal licence to legally manufacture industrial alcohol, which they sold illegally. The Genna brothers operated from Chicago's Little Italy, which was located west of the Chicago Loop.

The Genna brothers began selling their extra alcohol at cut-rate prices outside their territory. This produced a clash with the North Side Gang leader Dean O'Banion, who went to John "Johnny The Fox" Torrio and Unione Siciliana boss Mike Merlo to get the Gennas to back down. Torrio refused and O'Banion and his gang began hijacking shipments of whiskey that belonged to the Genna brothers. Torrio then ordered his men to murder O'Banion; they carried out the hit on November 10, 1924. Frankie Yale along with two formerly-Genna aligned gunmen—John Scalise and Albert Anselmi— entered O'Banion's flower shop and shot him multiple times. It is believed that Antonio "Tony the Scourge" Lombardo and the Unione Siciliano planned the assassination after the attack on the Gennas' bootlegging operation after O'Banion heard rumours that the "guinea dagos" were muscling in on O'Banion's joints.

Gang war

After O'Banion's murder, Chicago erupted into gang war. The North Side Gang, led by George "Bugs" Moran, shot and wounded Torrio outside his home. Torrio fled to Italy, leaving Al Capone as boss. The North Side Gang took aim at the Genna brothers and on May 27, 1925, Moran chased down Angelo Genna in a high-speed car chase, then shot him to death. On June 13, 1925, Mike Genna was gunned down by police after a shootout with the North Siders. Antonio Genna was shot to death on July 8, 1925, in an ambush. The remaining three brothers Jim, Sam, and Pete fled Chicago.

Joe Aiello and the last fight
Giuseppe "Joe" Aiello and his brothers Salvatore "Sam" and Pietro "Peter" declared themselves bosses of the old Genna brothers territory of Little Italy. The Aiello brothers had an alliance with the Castellammarese Clan boss Salvatore Maranzano and close connection to the North Side Gang. The brothers attempted to murder Al Capone and become the most powerful organization in Chicago. Giuseppe Aiello was murdered in 1930 and Capone took over all Italian organized crime.

Members of Chicago's Sicilian Mafia

Bosses
1914-1921 — Anthony D'Andrea – led the Unione Siciliana backed by the Gennas. He was murdered on May 11, 1921.
1921-1925 — Angelo Genna – murdered on May 27, 1925.
1925 — Samuzzo Amatuna – led the Unione Siciliana. He was murdered on November 13, 1925.
1925-1930 — Joseph Aiello – murdered on October 23, 1930.

Other members

Antonio Genna – murdered on July 8, 1925.   
Mike Genna – murdered on June 13, 1925.   
Vincenzo Genna died November 8, 1931
Peter Genna died May 13, 1948
Sam Genna died Dec 20, 1951
Mariano Zagone – Black Hand; murdered in May 1909.
Joseph "Diamond Joe" Esposito – murdered on March 21, 1928.
Samuzzo Amatuna - Angelo's bodyguard; became boss after Angelo's death; Unione Siciliana president; murdered on November 13, 1925.

Rival
Rosario Dispenza – Black Hand member and was a Morello crime family Chicago contact. Dispenza was murdered in 1914.
Salvatore Cardinella gang – also operated in Little Italy and Little Sicily.

See also
 Italians in Chicago

References

Organizations established in 1919
1919 establishments in Illinois
Organizations disestablished in 1930
1930 disestablishments in Illinois
Italian-American crime families
Italian-American culture in Chicago
Prohibition gangs
Former gangs in Chicago